So Close, So far (Kheili Dour, Kheili Nazdik) is a 2005 Iranian drama film directed by Reza Mirkarimi. The film was also selected as Iran's representative for Best Foreign Language Film at the Oscars.

Plot
An arrogant neurologist must examine the meaning of his life when his son is diagnosed with an inoperable brain tumor. His trek through the desert to catch up with his son's astronomy field trip leads him to encounter a number of seemingly ordinary people who challenge his views and values.

References 
 So Close, So far on the Soureh Cinema
 Close, So far on the CNet Cinema

External links
 

2005 films
2005 drama films
2000s Persian-language films
Iranian drama films
Crystal Simorgh for Best Film winners
Films directed by Reza Mirkarimi